The Small Form Factor Committee (SFF) is an ad hoc electronics industry group formed to quickly develop interoperability specifications (as a complement to the traditional standards process).

The SFF Committee was formed in 1990 to define the emerging disk drive form factor for laptop computers.  In November 1992, the members broadened the objectives to complement the formal standards process in any area of the storage industry which needed prompt attention.  SFF projects are in areas not addressed by standards committees because of timing, charter, or other considerations.

The committee consists of members that represent companies that develop, manufacture, and sell products and components for the storage industry.  Its members include but are not limited to representatives from companies such as Amphenol Interconnect, Avago Technologies, Broadcom, Dell, FCI Electronics, Foxconn, Fujitsu Components America, Hewlett Packard, Hitachi, IBM, Intel, LSI Corporation, Molex, Panduit, Pioneer Corporation, Samsung, Seagate Technology, Sumitomo Electric Industries, Sun Microsystems, Texas Instruments, Toshiba, Tyco Electronics, and W. L. Gore & Associates.

It was absorbed by the Storage Networking Industry Association.

See also
Small Form Factor Special Interest Group

References

External links
 SFF Technology Affiliate
 SFF Specifications

Technology trade associations
Organizations established in 1990